Camera+ is an app for Apple's iOS mobile operating system developed by LateNiteSoft. The app serves as an alternative to the standard iOS camera app, primarily adding basic and advanced editing tools (including special effects and lighting filters), an image stabilizer, and integrated sharing with Facebook, Flickr, and Twitter. 

Camera+ received generally positive reception; PC Advisor gave the app  stars out of 5 and declared it a "must-have" app for iPhone photographers, praising its advanced editing functionality for allowing users to "[make] poor snaps into great photographs that will wow your friends", making the built-in camera app feel like a pinhole in comparison. Wired gave the app a 9 out of 10, describing it as a "secret weapon" for photographers, and stating that it contained so much functionality that it was "too easy to get lost in the deeply layered menus or forget where you found that killer function the other day." In May 2012, Apple revealed that Camera+ was the 10th most popular paid app of all time among iPhone users.

References

iOS software
Camera software

LateNiteSoft's Web Page